Jadier Valladares Guzmán (born October 11, 1982, in Havana) is a male weightlifter from Cuba. He twice won a gold medal at the Pan American Games (2003 and 2007) for his native South American country. Valladares represented Cuba at the 2008 Summer Olympics in Beijing, PR China.

References

External links
 sports-reference

1982 births
Living people
Cuban male weightlifters
Olympic weightlifters of Cuba
Weightlifters at the 2003 Pan American Games
Weightlifters at the 2007 Pan American Games
Weightlifters at the 2008 Summer Olympics
Sportspeople from Havana
Pan American Games silver medalists for Cuba
Pan American Games medalists in weightlifting
Central American and Caribbean Games bronze medalists for Cuba
Competitors at the 2006 Central American and Caribbean Games
Central American and Caribbean Games medalists in weightlifting
Medalists at the 2007 Pan American Games
Olympic medalists in weightlifting
Olympic bronze medalists for Cuba
Medalists at the 2008 Summer Olympics
Pan American Weightlifting Championships medalists
21st-century Cuban people